Events from the year 1947 in France.

Incumbents
President: Léon Blum (until 16 January), Vincent Auriol (starting 16 January)
President of the Council of Ministers: 
 until 22 January: Léon Blum 
 22 January – 24 November: Paul Ramadier 
 starting 24 November: Robert Schuman

Events
16 January – Vincent Auriol is inaugurated as President of France.
10 February – Paris peace treaties are signed between the World War II Allies and Italy, Hungary, Romania, Bulgaria and Finland.
12 February – Christian Dior introduces The "New Look" in women's fashion, in Paris.
28 February – United States gives France a military base in Casablanca.
29 March – Malagasy Uprising: Nationalist "tribesmen" began a revolt in the eastern part of Madagascar against French rule.
6 May – Malagasy Uprising: In Moramanga, the French military machine-gun Mouvement démocratique de la rénovation malgache (MDRM) officials detained in wagons, killing 124 to 160 mostly unarmed activists.
11 July – SS Exodus departs France for Palestine with 4,500 Jewish Holocaust survivor refugees.
27 July – Ocean Liberty explodes in Brest harbour causing at least 26 deaths and extensive damage.
July – Five North-African regiments arrive in Madagascar to assist in quelling the Malagasy Uprising.
27 August – Government lowering of the bread ration to 200 grammes causes riots in Verdun and Le Mans.
30 August – Fire at a cinema in Rueil, a suburb of Paris, kills 87.
September – Festival d'Avignon first staged.
7 October – Operation Léa begins in Vietnam, an attempt by the French to crush the Viet Minh.
10 November – The arrest of four steel workers in Marseille begins a communist riot that spreads to Paris.
20 November – Paul Ramadier resigns as Prime Minister of France – he is succeeded by Robert Schuman. Schuman calls 80,000 reservists to quell rioting miners.
27 November – In Paris, police occupy the editorial offices of communist newspapers.
3 December – French communist strikers derail the Paris-Tourcoing express train because of false rumours that it is transporting soldiers – 21 dead.
4 December – Interior minister Jules Moch secures emergency measures against riots after six days of violent arguments in the National Assembly of France.
9 December – Labour unions call off the general strike and begin negotiations with the French government.
22 December – Operation Lea ends with a tactical success for the French forces.

Sport
25 June – Tour de France begins.
20 July – Tour de France ends, won by Jean Robic.

Births
16 January – Juliet Berto, actress (died 1990)
17 January – Alain Payet, adult film director (died 2007)
31 January – Bernard Guignedoux, football player and manager (died 2021)
25 February – Marc Sautet, philosopher and writer (died 1998)
1 April – Alain Connes, mathematician
13 April – Jean-Jacques Laffont, economist (died 2004)
15 June – Alain Aspect, quantum physicist, recipient of the Nobel Prize in Physics
4 July – Jacques Morali, music producer (died 1991)
10 July – Michel Étiévent, journalist, historian and writer (died 2021)
24 July – Jacques Fouroux, international rugby union player, coach (died 2005)
30 July – Françoise Barré-Sinoussi, virologist, recipient of the Nobel Prize in Physiology or Medicine
3 September – Gérard Houllier, football manager (died 2020)
20 September – Patrick Poivre d'Arvor, television news presenter
9 October – France Gall, singer (died 2018)
28 November – Michel Berger, singer and songwriter (died 1992)
2 December – Isaac Bitton, drummer

Deaths
23 January – Pierre Bonnard, painter and printmaker (born 1867)
19 February – Pierre Besnard, revolutionary syndicalist (born 1886)
15 March – Jean-Richard Bloch, critic, novelist and playwright (born 1884)
13 April – Jean Chassagne, racing driver (born 1881)
14 June – Albert Marquet, painter (born 1875)
21 September – Marcel Astier, politician (born 1885)
24 November – Léon-Paul Fargue, poet and essayist (born 1876)
7 December – Tristan Bernard, playwright, novelist, journalist and lawyer (born 1866)

Full date unknown
Mary Bonaparte, eldest daughter of Prince Napoléon Bonaparte of Canino (born 1870)

See also
 List of French films of 1947

References

1940s in France